Zazen (literally "seated meditation"; ; , pronounced ) is a meditative discipline that is typically the primary practice of the Zen Buddhist tradition. 

The generalized Japanese term for meditation is 瞑想 (meisō); however, zazen has been used informally to include all forms of seated Buddhist meditation. The term zuòchán can be found in early Chinese Buddhist sources, such as the Dhyāna sutras. For example, the famous translator Kumārajīva (344-413) translated a work termed Zuòchán sān mēi jīng (A Manual on the Samādhi of Sitting Meditation) and the Chinese Tiantai master Zhiyi (538–597 CE) wrote some very influential works on sitting meditation. The earliest manual on sitting meditation from an author of the Zen tradition is the Zuòchán Yí which dates to the Northern Song dynasty (CE 960 - 1126).

The meaning and method of zazen varies from school to school, but in general it is a quiet type of Buddhist meditation done in a sitting posture like the lotus position. The practice can be done with various methods, such as following the breath (anapanasati), mentally repeating a phrase (which could be a koan, a mantra, a huatou or nianfo) and a kind of open monitoring in which one is aware of whatever comes to our attention (sometimes called shikantaza or silent illumination). Repeating a huatou (a short meditation phrase) is a common method in Chinese Chan and Korean Seon. Meanwhile, the practice of silently reciting the Buddha Amitabha's name is common in the traditions influenced by Pure Land practice, and was also taught by Chan masters like Zongmi. 

In the Japanese Buddhist Rinzai school, zazen is usually combined with the study of koans. The Japanese Sōtō School makes less or no use of koans, preferring an approach known as shikantaza where the mind has no object at all.

Practice

Five types of Zazen
Kapleau quotes Hakuun Yasutani's lectures for beginners. In lecture four, Yasutani lists five kinds of zazen:
 bompu, developing meditative concentration to aid well-being;
 gedo, zazen-like practices from other religious traditions;
 shojo, 'small vehicle' practices;
 daijo, zazen aimed at gaining insight into true nature;
 saijojo, shikantaza.

Sitting 

In Zen temples and monasteries, practitioners traditionally sit zazen together in a meditation hall usually referred to as a zendo, each sitting on a cushion called a zafu which itself may be placed on a low, flat mat called a zabuton. Practitioners of the Rinzai school sit facing each other with their backs to the wall, while those of the Sōtō school sit facing the wall or a curtain. Before taking one's seat, and after rising at the end of a period of zazen, a Zen practitioner performs a gassho bow to their seat, and a second bow to fellow practitioners. The beginning of a period of zazen is traditionally announced by ringing a bell three times (shijosho), and the end of the period by ringing the bell either once or twice (hozensho). Long periods of zazen may alternate with periods of kinhin (walking meditation).

Posture 
The posture of zazen is seated, with crossed legs and folded hands, and an erect but settled spine. The hands are folded together into a simple mudra over the belly. In many practices, the practitioner breathes from the hara (the center of gravity in the belly) and the eyelids are half-lowered, the eyes being neither fully open nor shut so that the practitioner is neither distracted by, nor turning away from, external stimuli.

The legs are folded in one of the standard sitting styles:
 Kekkafuza (full-lotus)
 Hankafuza (half-lotus)
 Burmese (a cross-legged posture in which the ankles are placed together in front of the sitter)
 Seiza (a kneeling posture using a bench or zafu)

It is not uncommon for modern practitioners to practice zazen in a chair, sometimes with a wedge or cushion on top of it so that one is sitting on an incline, or by placing a wedge behind the lower back to help maintain the natural curve of the spine.

Samadhi
The initial stages of training in zazen resemble traditional Buddhist samatha meditation. The student begins by focusing on the breath at the hara/tanden with mindfulness of breath (ānāpānasmṛti) exercises such as counting breath (sūsokukan 数息観) or just watching it (zuisokukan 随息観). Mantras are also sometimes used in place of counting. Practice is typically to be continued in one of these ways until there is adequate "one-pointedness" of mind to constitute an initial experience of samadhi. At this point, the practitioner moves on to koan-practice or shikantaza.

Koan introspection

In the Rinzai school, after having developed awareness, the practitioner can now focus their consciousness on a koan as an object of meditation. While koan practice is generally associated with the Rinzai school and Shikantaza with the Sōtō school, many Zen communities use both methods depending on the teacher and students.

Shikantaza

Zazen is considered the heart of Japanese Sōtō Zen Buddhist practice. The aim of zazen is just sitting, that is, suspending all judgemental thinking and letting words, ideas, images and thoughts pass by without getting involved in them. Practitioners do not use any specific object of meditation, instead remaining as much as possible in the present moment, aware of and observing what is occurring around them and what is passing through their minds. Dogen says, in his Shobogenzo, "Sitting fixedly, think of not thinking. How do you think of not thinking? Nonthinking. This is the art of zazen."

See also 
 Walking meditation
 Ango
 Jing zuo
 Keisaku
 Sesshin
 Suizen
 Zuowang

References

Further reading

External links

 How to sit Zazen 

 
Zen
Buddhist meditation